Street Survivors Tour was the sixth major concert tour by American Southern rock band Lynyrd Skynyrd. The tour took place in North America, Europe and for the first time Asia.

What turned out to be the final tour of the original band had the ominous title, "Tour of the Survivors", and truly was as three band members were killed in a plane crash
on October 20, 1977, the day after their show on October 19, 1977, in Greenville, South Carolina, which was the fourth date of their forty-five day tour. The band was flying to the next date of its tour in Baton Rouge, Louisiana.

Typical setlist
 Workin' for MCA
 I Ain't the One
 Saturday Night Special
 Whiskey Rock-A-Roller
 That Smell
 Travelin' Man
 Ain't No Good Life
 Gimme Three Steps
 Call Me the Breeze
 T for Texas
 Sweet Home Alabama
 Free Bird

Tour dates

Personnel
 Ronnie Van Zant – vocals
 Gary Rossington – guitars
 Allen Collins – guitars
 Steve Gaines   – guitars
 Leon Wilkeson – bass
 Artimus Pyle – drums
 Billy Powell - keyboards

References

External links
Chrome Oxide Skynyrd Set List

1977 concert tours
Lynyrd Skynyrd concert tours